Illyria is a musical with book, music, and lyrics by Peter Mills, based on William Shakespeare's Twelfth Night, written in 2002. Illyria is a traditional adaption of Twelfth Night, but features a more contemporary score.

Illyria began as Prospect Theater Company's musical production of Twelfth Night in Central Park in 2001. The company's artistic director Cara Reichel and resident writer Pete Mills then collaborated to create a complete musical adaption. The musical premiered from April 12 through the 28th at the Hudson Guild Theater, New York City.

Plot

Act I
Feste, a jester, welcomes the audience and introduces them to the world of Illyria and each character featured in the show (“Illyria”). Viola is able to make it to shore, but is unable to find her brother, and assumes he is dead. She decides to take on his identity, reasoning that it would be safer to be a man in an unfamiliar place ("Sebastian").

Dressed as Sebastian, Viola finds work as a servant for Orsino, a Duke who is in love with the Countess Olivia. Orsino sends Viola to ask for Olivia's hand, but Viola soon realizes she has feelings for Orsino ("How These Things Start").

Meanwhile, Feste returns to Olivia's home after spending several years away. He is surprised that Olivia is still mourning for her brother (and Feste's former master), and takes it upon himself to bring joy back into the household. He lightheartedly mocks Maria about her love for Sir Toby, and brings back an old rivalry with the steward Malvolio ("Silly Little Syllogisms"). Feste's efforts to cheer up Olivia work, and she agrees to receive a visitor, Viola ("Olivia"). The Countess is quite taken with her, and as Viola leaves to report back to Orsino, Malvolio gives her a gift from Olivia, a ring ("The Ring").

It is revealed that Sebastian has survived the shipwreck, and he enters Illyria with Antonio, the man who rescued him ("Crossovers").

At Olivia's house, Feste, Toby, Maria, and Olivia's suitor Andrew are all annoyed with Malvolio after he gets them in trouble ("Cakes and Ale"). The four work together to create a plan for revenge ("The Man is Mine").

At the Duke's palace, Viola and Orsino have a conversation on love. Viola realizes how much she cares for him, but knows she must wait until she can safely reveal her true identity before the two can be together (“Patience”). However, the next morning Orsino discovers the ring that Olivia gifted Viola, and he yet again sends Viola to her home ("We Men").

Meanwhile, the revenge plan is set in motion as Maria writes a “secret admirer” letter to Malvolio, written to seem as though Olivia sent it. The letter tells Malvolio to dress and act in a ridiculous way in order to prove he loves Olivia back (“The Love Letter”).

Viola, yet again with Olivia, realizes that the Countess has fallen in love with her instead of Orsino ("Undone"). The act closes as Viola, Olivia, and Orsino worry about their seemingly hopeless situations (“Save One”).

Act II
The second act begins with Maria's revenge plan working: Malvolio clumsily flirts with Olivia while dressed in ridiculous yellow socks (“Malvolio’s Tango”). Olivia assumes he has gone mad, and has Sir Toby take him away.

The real Sebastian makes it to the Duke's palace, and the Duke, assuming that he is Viola, declares his love ("Whoever You Are"). Sebastian panics and flees to Olivia's house, where he is once again mistaken for Viola. Sebastian and Viola end up in an absurd duel with Sir Andrew, which was set up by Maria and Toby (“The Duel”). Olivia rescues Sebastian from the duel and professes her love. Sebastian is confused but accepts ("The Lady Must Be Mad").

Malvolio, now imprisoned, begs Feste to release him or at least deliver a message to the Countess ("The Lunatic"). Eventually, through a wild musical sequence, Sebastian and Viola are reunited and all the misunderstandings are resolved. Orsino and Viola are together, Olivia and Sebastian are together, and Toby and Maria reunite as well. Feste and the full cast address the audience and say goodbye (“Finale”).

Music
The score of Illyria is contemporary musical theater, drawing in elements of classic Broadway shows and comic light opera.

Musical Numbers
1. Prologue - Feste and Company
1a. Sebastian - Viola
2. How These Things Start - Orsino and Viola
3. Silly Little Syllogisms - Feste and Olivia
4. Olivia - Viola and Olivia
5. Crossovers - Sebastian and Viola
5a. The Ring - Viola
6. Cakes And Ale - Toby, Andrew, Feste, and Maria
7. Patience - Viola
8. The Man Is Mine - Maria, Toby, Andrew, and Feste
9. We Men - Orsino and Viola
10. The Love Letter - Malvolio and Olivia
11. Undone - Olivia and Viola
12. Save One - Viola, Olivia, and Orsino
13. Malvolio's Tango - Malvolio
14. Whoever You Are - Orsino 
15. The Duel - Toby, Andrew, Maria, Viola, Antonio, Sebastian, and Olivia
16. The Lunatic - Feste and Malvolio
17. The Lady Must Be Mad - Sebastian
18. Finale - Company

Characters and original casts

Viola, Sebastian's passionate and spunky twin sister who takes on his identity
Sebastian, Viola's naïve and optimistic twin brother
 Duke Orsino, Illyria's ruler who is in love with Olivia
Olivia, a beautiful noblewoman of Illyria
Malvolio, Olivia's full-of-himself steward
Sir Toby, Olivia's lazy uncle who is in love with Maria
Maria, Olivia's confidante and maid
Sir Andrew Aguecheek, Olivia's comedic suitor
Feste, a clever jester who also serves as the musical's narrator
Antonio, a sailor who rescues Sebastian
Guards/Courtiers, in the service of Duke Orsino, who see to his every whim ands protect his dukedom
Ladies in Waiting, to Olivia, in her household and under the instruction of Maria

References

Musicals based on plays
Plays and musicals based on Twelfth Night
2004 musicals